The Upper Stone Schoolhouse, also known as the Scott House, is a historic One-room schoolhouse located east of Vinton, Iowa, United States. Built in 1875, this is an unusual example of a stone one-room school. The stone schoolhouse was replaced by a wood-frame building to the south sometime between 1905 and 1910 to accommodate the large number of students. It served eight rural sections of farmland from the time . The Scott family, who owned the adjacent farmland, bought the stone school building after it closed and converted it into a house. It was listed on the National Register of Historic Places in 1983.

References

School buildings completed in 1875
Buildings and structures in Benton County, Iowa
National Register of Historic Places in Benton County, Iowa
School buildings on the National Register of Historic Places in Iowa
One-room schoolhouses in Iowa